Piddig, officially the Municipality of Piddig is a 3rd class municipality in the province of Ilocos Norte, Philippines. According to the 2020 census, it has a population of 22,475 people.

The town is known for its role in the Basi Revolt, led by Pedro Mateo, a native of Piddig.  Today, Piddig is known for its basi and for their sariwagwag, a dish made out of gabi leaves with fresh shrimps that are freshly gathered from their rich river. The municipio (town hall) is located on top of a hill offering panoramic views of fields and mountains.

Piddig is the birthplace of Teófilo Yldefonso, a Filipino swimmer who is the first Filipino and Southeast Asian to win an Olympic medal, and the first Filipino to win multiple medals.

Geography
Piddig's terrain is hilly with rice plains interspersed in between. It sits at a higher elevation than most of the towns in Ilocos Norte. It is a great place for a day hike, if one does not mind traversing through rivers, forests, and fields.

Barangays
Piddig is politically subdivided into 23 barangays. These barangays are headed by elected officials: Barangay Captain, Barangay Council, whose members are called Barangay Councilors. All are elected every three years.

Climate

Demographics

Economy

Government
Piddig, belonging to the first congressional district of the province of Ilocos Norte, is governed by a mayor designated as its local chief executive and by a municipal council as its legislative body in accordance with the Local Government Code. The mayor, vice mayor, and the councilors are elected directly by the people through an election which is being held every three years.

Elected officials

Culture

|}

Education
Almost each barrio or barangay in Piddig has its own elementary school. The town's poblacion Anao, historically had two, Piddig Central (North) and South Piddig Central elementary schools. Both schools are situated next to each other north of town. The schools' rivalry is legendary. In the late 1980s the schools merged as one, Piddig Central.

There are three high schools in Piddig: Piddig National High School, Roosevelt High School, and St. Anne Academy (Catholic). However, many students attend high schools in nearby Laoag City.

References

External links

Piddig Unofficial Homepage
[ Philippine Standard Geographic Code]
Philippine Census Information
Local Governance Performance Management System

Municipalities of Ilocos Norte